Drasteria austera is a moth of the family Erebidae first described by Oscar John in 1917. It is found in Iran.

References

Drasteria
Moths described in 1917
Moths of Asia